T. Harlan and Helen Montgomery House is a historic home located at Seymour, Jackson County, Indiana.  It was built between 1922 and 1929, and is a two-story, Dutch Colonial Revival style frame dwelling with a gambrel roof.  It consists of a main rectangular block with a small portico, side porch, rear ell, and porte cochere.  Also on the property is a contributing garage constructed in 1926.

It was listed on the National Register of Historic Places in 2010.

References

Houses on the National Register of Historic Places in Indiana
Colonial Revival architecture in Indiana
Houses completed in 1929
Buildings and structures in Jackson County, Indiana
National Register of Historic Places in Jackson County, Indiana